Grayanotoxins are a group of closely related neurotoxins named after Leucothoe grayana, a plant native to Japan originally named for 19th century American botanist Asa Gray. Grayanotoxin I (grayanotaxane-3,5,6,10,14,16-hexol 14-acetate) is also known as andromedotoxin, acetylandromedol, rhodotoxin and asebotoxin. Grayanotoxins are produced by Rhododendron species and other plants in the family Ericaceae. Honey made from the nectar and so containing pollen of these plants also contains grayanotoxins and is commonly referred to as mad honey. Consumption of the plant or any of its secondary products, including mad honey, can cause a rare poisonous reaction called grayanotoxin poisoning, mad honey disease, honey intoxication, or rhododendron poisoning. It is most frequently produced and consumed in regions of Nepal and Turkey as a recreational drug and traditional medicine.

Origin 

Grayanotoxins are produced by plants in the family Ericaceae, specifically members of the genera Rhododendron, Pieris, Agarista and Kalmia. The genus Rhododendron alone encompasses over 750 species that grow around the world in parts of Europe, North America, Japan, Nepal and Turkey. They can grow at a variety of altitudes ranging from sea level to more than three kilometers above. While many of these species contain grayanotoxins, only a few contain significant levels. Species with high concentrations of grayanotoxins such as R. ponticum, R. flavum and R. luteum are most commonly found in Nepal and regions of Turkey bordering the Black Sea.
 Nearly all parts of grayanotoxin-producing rhododendrons contain the molecule, including the stem, leaves, flower, pollen and nectar. Grayanotoxins can also be found in secondary plant products such as honey, labrador tea, cigarettes and herbal medicines.

Chemical structure

Grayanotoxins are low molecular weight hydrophobic compounds. They are structurally characterized as polyhydroxylated cyclic diterpenes. The base structure is a 5/7/6/5 ring system that does not contain nitrogen.  More than 25 grayanotoxin isoforms have been identified from Rhododendron species, but grayanotoxin I and III are thought to be the principal toxic isoforms. Different Rhododendron species contain multiple different grayanotoxin isoforms, contributing to differences in plant toxicity.

Mechanism of action 

The toxicity of grayanotoxin is derived from its ability to interfere with voltage-gated sodium channels located in the cell membrane of neurons. The Nav1.x channels consist of four homologous domains (I-IV), each containing six transmembrane alpha-helical segments (S1-S6). Grayanotoxin has a binding affinity (IC50) of approximately 10 μM and binds the group II receptor site located on segment 6 of domains I and IV (IS6 and IVS6). Other toxins that bind to this region include the alkaloids veratridine, batrachotoxin and aconitine.

Experiments utilizing squid axonal membranes indicate that sodium channel binding likely occurs on the internal face of the neuron. Additionally, grayanotoxin only binds to the activated conformation of sodium channels. Normally, voltage gated sodium channels are activated (opened) only when the cell membrane potential reaches a specific threshold voltage. This activated conformation allows for an influx of sodium ions resulting in cell depolarization, followed by the firing of an action potential. At the peak of the action potential, voltage-gated sodium channels are quickly inactivated and are only reset once the cell has repolarized to resting potential. When grayanotoxin is present, binding induces further conformational changes that prevent sodium channel inactivation and lead to a prolonged depolarization. Owing to its transient ability to activate channels and increase membrane permeability to sodium ions, grayanotoxin is classified as a reversible Nav1.x agonist.

Biological effects 
Prolonged sodium channel activation and cell depolarization leads to overstimulation of the central nervous system. Physical symptoms from grayanotoxin poisoning appear after a dose-dependent latent period of several minutes to approximately three hours. The most common clinical symptoms include various cardiovascular effects, nausea and vomiting, and a change in consciousness.  The cardiovascular effects may include hypotension (low blood pressure) and various cardiac rhythm disorders such as sinus bradycardia (slow regular heart rhythm), bradyarrhythmia (slow irregular heart rhythm) and partial or complete atrioventricular block.

Other early-onset symptoms may include diplopia and blurred vision, dizziness, hypersalivation, perspiration, weakness and paresthesia in the extremities and around the mouth.  In higher doses, symptoms can include loss of coordination, severe and progressive muscular weakness, electrocardiographic changes of bundle branch block and/or ST-segment elevations as seen in ischemic myocardial threat, and nodal rhythm or Wolff-Parkinson-White syndrome.

The primary mediator of this grayanotoxin pathophysiology is the paired vagus nerve (tenth cranial nerve).  The vagus nerve is a major component of the parasympathetic nervous system (a branch of the autonomic nervous system) and innervates various organs including the lungs, stomach, kidney and heart.  In one study, experimental administration of grayanotoxin to bilaterally vagotomized rats failed to induce bradycardia, a common symptom of grayanotoxin poisoning, supporting the role of vagal stimulation. Vagal stimulation of the myocardium, specifically, is mediated by M2-subtype muscarinic acetylcholine receptors (mAChR).  In severe cases of grayanotoxin poisoning, atropine (a non-specific "mAChR antagonist" or Muscarinic antagonist) can be used to treat bradycardia and other heart rhythm malfunctions. In addition to correcting rhythm disorders, administration of fluids and vasopressors can also help treat hypotension and mitigate other symptoms.

Patients exposed to low doses of grayanotoxin typically recover within a few hours. In more severe cases, symptoms may persist for 24 hours or longer and may require medical treatment (as described above). Despite the risk from cardiac problems, grayanotoxin poisoning is rarely fatal in humans.

Animal poisoning 
In contrast to humans, grayanotoxin poisoning can be lethal for other animals. Nectar containing grayanotoxin can kill honeybees, though some seem to have resistance to it and can produce honey from the nectar (see below). According to a team of researchers from the UK and Ireland, worker bumblebees are not harmed and may be preferable as pollinators because they transfer more pollen. Consequently, it may be advantageous for plants to produce grayanotoxin in order to be pollinated by bumblebees.

Mad honey intoxication
Bees that collect pollen and nectar from grayanotoxin-containing plants often produce honey that also contains grayanotoxins. This so-called "mad honey" is the most common cause of grayanotoxin poisoning in humans.  Small-scale producers of mad honey typically harvest honey from a small area or single hive in order to produce a final product containing a significant concentration of grayanotoxin. In contrast, large-scale honey production often mixes honey gathered from different locations, diluting the concentration of any contaminated honey.

Mad honey is deliberately produced in some regions of the world, most notably Nepal and the Black Sea region of Turkey.  In Nepal, this type of honey is used by the Gurung people for both its hallucinogenic properties and supposed medicinal benefits. In Turkey, mad honey known as deli bal is also used as a recreational drug and traditional medicine. It is most commonly made from the nectar of Rhododendron luteum and Rhododendron ponticum in the Caucasus region. In the eighteenth century, this honey was exported to Europe to add to alcoholic drinks to give them extra potency. In modern times, it is consumed locally and exported to North America, Europe and Asia.

In addition to various Rhododendron species, mad honey can also be made from several other grayanotoxin-containing plants. Honey produced from the nectar of Andromeda polifolia contains high enough levels of grayanotoxin to cause full body paralysis and potentially fatal breathing difficulties due to diaphragm paralysis. Honey obtained from spoonwood and allied species such as sheep-laurel can also cause illness. The honey from Lestrimelitta limao also produces this paralyzing effect seen in the honey of A. polifolia and is also toxic to humans.

Although mad honey is used in traditional medicine in Turkey, the majority of grayanotoxin poisoning cases occur in middle-aged males who use the honey for perceived sexual enhancement.

Historical use 
The intoxicating effects of mad honey have been known for thousands of years. There have been many famous episodes of human inebriation caused by its consumption. Xenophon, Aristotle, Strabo, Pliny the Elder and Columella all document the results of eating this "maddening" honey, believed to be from the pollen and nectar of Rhododendron luteum and Rhododendron ponticum. According to Xenophon's Anabasis, an invading Greek army was accidentally poisoned by harvesting and eating the local Asia Minor honey, but they all made a quick recovery without any fatalities. Having heard of this incident, and realizing that foreign invaders would be ignorant of the dangers of the local honey, King Mithridates later used the honey as a deliberate poison when Pompey's army attacked the Heptakometes in Asia Minor in 69 BC.  The Roman soldiers became delirious and nauseated after being tricked into eating the toxic honey, at which point Mithridates's army attacked.

Popular culture 
Mad honey disease is an element of the 2009 movie Sherlock Holmes. It was also featured in the episode "New Jazz" of the television series Atlanta.

See also 
Incilius alvarius
Sarpa salpa
Potassium channel

References 

Beekeeping
Neurotoxins
Ion channel toxins
Diterpenes
Cyclopentanes
Sodium channel openers
Plant toxins